All the Girls in the World Beware!!! is the ninth studio album by American hard rock band Grand Funk Railroad. The album was released by Capitol Records in December 1974 and was the group's second album released that year. The first single from the album, "Some Kind of Wonderful", was released on December 16, 1974, and its follow-up, "Bad Time", was released on March 24, 1975. A Quadraphonic mix of the album was available on the Quadraphonic 8-Track cartridge format.

Recording, production, and songs
All the Girls in the World Beware!!! was recorded at the Swamp, a studio owned by Mark Farner and situated on his farm in Parshallville, MI. The recording engineer on the sessions was Shelly Yakus with assistance by Kevin Ayers and Rod O'Brien. The album's producer was Jimmy Ienner. Ienner worked with many pop and rock musicians including Three Dog Night, the Raspberries, and the Bay City Rollers, among others. Ienner would later work on the 1987 film Dirty Dancing, as well as the film's soundtrack.

All but two of the songs on the album were written by members of the band, most of which were either written or co-written by Mark Farner. The album also saw an increase in the number of songs co-written by Craig Frost, who co-wrote three songs on the album—which was more than he had written on the three previous albums that he recorded with the group. During this time, Mark Farner was getting divorced from his first wife, which inspired the lyrics to "Bad Time" and other Farner written songs on the album.

Artwork and design
The album's artwork originated from a concept by Lynn Goldsmith and Andrew Cavaliere, which included taking the faces of the band members and manipulating them onto the bodies of famous body builders Arnold Schwarzenegger and Franco Columbu. The body builder photos were used on the front and back of the vinyl sleeve cover, and were printed on the disc labels. The inside sleeve included an illustrated poster of the body builders surrounded by a crowd of women, which was illustrated by Neal Adams.

1975 world tour
During the finalizing of the album, the group was preparing to undergo a world tour at the beginning of 1975. The tour started on January 2 in Mobile, Alabama, and ended on May 28 in Hawaii. The tour also included several stops around Europe in April and concerts in Canada and Japan in May.

Track listing
All songs written and composed by Mark Farner, except where noted.

Personnel
The following people contributed to All the Girls in the World Beware!!!:

 Mark Farner – vocals, guitars, percussion
 Craig Frost – organ, keyboards, percussion, background vocals
 Mel Schacher – bass
 Don Brewer – vocals, drums, percussion
 Jimmy Ienner – producer
 Shelly Yakus – recording engineer
 Kevin Ayers – assistant engineer
 Rod O'Brien – assistant engineer
 Tony Camillo – string and horn arrangements

Charts
Album

Singles

References

1974 albums
Grand Funk Railroad albums
Albums produced by Jimmy Ienner
Capitol Records albums